Seven Types of Ambiguity  is a 2003 novel by Australian writer Elliot Perlman.

Plot summary

The novel is narrated by seven different characters whose lives intersect in various ways. The first of these, Alex Klima, is a Czech psychiatrist who has been hired to treat Simon for his depression. Simon is obsessed with his ex-lover Anna, and it is this obsession that leads him in a downward spiral. He takes a child from school but the child is found a few hours later. The boy is the son of Anna and the police wonder if the case is more complex than it first appears.

Awards

 2004 shortlisted Commonwealth Writers Prize — South East Asia and South Pacific Region — Best Book 
 2004 shortlisted Miles Franklin Literary Award 
 2004 shortlisted Queensland Premier's Literary Awards — Best Fiction Book

Reviews

 The Guardian
 The New York Times
 The Sydney Morning Herald

Television series
A six-part series based on the novel was screened on ABC Television in 2017.

References

2003 Australian novels